Eygló Harðardóttir (born 12 December 1972) is an Icelandic politician. She served as Iceland's Minister of Social Affairs and Housing 2013–2017.
She has a degree in art from the University of Stockholm and has studied economics at the University of Iceland.
She became active in local politics 2003, for Framsóknarflokkurinn, a Nordic agrarian centre-right party. In 2008 she was elected as a representative to the Althing, the Icelandic parliament.

References 

 Biography of Eygló Harðardóttir - Parliamentary website

1972 births
Living people
Eyglo Hardardottir
Eyglo Hardardottir
Eyglo Hardardottir
Stockholm University alumni
Eyglo Hardardottir